Timbis Air is a regional airline based in Nairobi, Kenya. It was founded in  November 2009 and operates regional regular schedule and charter services. Its main base is Jomo Kenyatta International Airport, Nairobi.

Fleet
The Timbis Air fleet consists of the following aircraft (as of February 2020):

References

External links
 

Airlines of Kenya
1999 establishments in Kenya
Airlines established in 1999
Companies based in Nairobi
Kenyan brands